The BWF World Championships, formerly known as IBF World Championships, and also known as the World Badminton Championships, is a badminton tournament sanctioned by Badminton World Federation (BWF). The tournament is one of the most prestigious in badminton, offering the most ranking points, together with the Summer Olympics badminton tournaments which was first introduced in 1992. The winners of this tournament are also crowned as "World Champions" of the sport, and are awarded a gold medal.

The tournament started in 1977 and was held once every three years until 1983. However, the IBF (International Badminton Federation) faced difficulty in hosting the first two events as the World Badminton Federation (which later merged with the IBF to form one badminton federation) hosted the same tournament a year after the IBF World Championships with the same goals. 

Since 1985, the tournament became biennial and played once every two years until 2005. Starting 2006, the tournament was changed to an annual event on the BWF calendar. The tournament is not held during the Summer Olympics years to avoid schedule conflicts.

Location of the World Championships
The table below gives an overview of all host cities and countries of the World Championships. The most recent games were held in Huelva. The number in parentheses following the city/country denotes how many times that city/country has hosted the championships. From 1989 to 2001 the world championships were held immediately after the Sudirman Cup at the same location.

Past winners

As of 2022, only 21 countries have achieved at least a bronze medal in the tournament: 11 from Asia, eight from Europe, and one each from Oceania and North America. Africa is the only confederation that has not won a medal.

At the age of 18, Ratchanok Inthanon became the youngest winner of a singles title at the Championships. Ratchanok was less than 3 months older than Jang Hye-ock was when she won the women's doubles title at the 1995 Championships.

Most successful players & national teams

Most successful players
Several players have won gold medals in more than one category in a World Championship; this includes:
 Lene Køppen, 1977, mixed doubles and women's singles
 Christian Hadinata, 1980, men's doubles and mixed doubles
 Park Joo-bong, 1985 & 1991, men's doubles and mixed doubles
 Han Aiping, 1985, women's singles and doubles
 Ge Fei, 1997, women's doubles and mixed doubles
 Kim Dong-moon, 1999, men's doubles and mixed doubles
 Gao Ling, 2001, women's doubles and mixed doubles
 Zhao Yunlei, 2014 & 2015, women's doubles and mixed doubles

From 1977 up to 2001, the medals were usually divided among five countries, namely China, Korea, Denmark, Indonesia, Malaysia. However, in 2003, the winners included seven countries and in 2005 the medal board contained a record high of ten countries.

Tony Gunawan also bears the distinction of winning a gold medal in Men's Doubles, representing two countries, 2001 partnering with Halim Haryanto for Indonesia and in 2005 partnering with Howard Bach to give the United States its first medal in the competition.

The 2005 edition also brought new faces to the mixed doubles event which had been dominated by China and Korea since 1997. With the retirement of defending champions and two-time winners Kim Dong-moon/Ra Kyung-min (Korea), Nova Widianto/Liliyana Natsir won Indonesia's first mixed doubles gold since 1980 when Christian Hadinata/Imelda Wiguna won it last for Indonesia.

Below is the list of the most successful players ever, with 3 or more gold medals.

Below is the list of the most successful player(s) in each category (listed according to their last title):

MS: Men's singles; WS: Women's singles; MD: Men's doubles; WD: Women's doubles; XD: Mixed doubles

Most successful national teams
Below is the gold medalists shown based by category and countries after the 2021 Championships. China has been the most successful in the World Championships ever since its inception in 1977. They were the only country ever to achieve a shutout of the medals which they did in 1987, 2010 and 2011.

BOLD means overall winner of that World Championships

 Korea won on the superior of two silver medals to China's one and thus Korea became the overall winner.
 China won on superior of four silver medals to Indonesia's one and thus China became the overall winner.
 China won on the superior of two silver medals to Indonesia's none and thus China became the overall winner.
 China won on superior of four bronze medals to Japan's two and thus China became the overall winner.

Championship per countries

Men's singles

Women's singles

Men's doubles

Women's doubles

Mixed doubles

Medal table

Medal distribution

Men's singles

Due to the disqualification on suspicion of violation of anti-doping regulations, the 2014 silver medalist Lee Chong Wei was stripped of his medal and thus the medal count does not add up.

Women's singles

Men's doubles

Women's doubles

Mixed doubles

See also
BWF World Senior Championships

References

External links

 
BWF
Recurring sporting events established in 1977